The 1985 season was the 16th season of national competitive association football in Australia and 102nd overall.

National teams

Australia men's national soccer team

Results and fixtures

Friendlies

1986 FIFA World Cup qualification

Group stage

Inter-confederation play-offs

Domestic soccer

National Soccer League

For the second season of the conference format in the National Soccer League, Sydney City and South Melbourne won the Premierships from their respective conferences. The Grand Final was played between Sydney City and Brunswick Juventus, which Brunswick won 2–0 on aggregate winning their first national title.

NSL Cup

Final

Managerial changes
This is a list of changes of managers within Australian league soccer:

Retirements
 29 January 1985: Michael McLaughlin, 20, former Blacktown City striker.

References

External links
 Football Australia official website

1985 in Australian sport
1985 in Australian soccer
Seasons in Australian soccer